Søren Westphal (born 8 July 1986) is a Danish handballer, currently the goalkeeper of Danish Handball League side Aalborg Håndbold. He has previously played for league rivals club GOG Svendborg and KIF Kolding København.

During his youth career, Westphal played several matches for the Danish national youth handball teams.

External links
 profile

1986 births
Living people
Danish male handball players